The Neff Tavern Smokehouse is a historic smokehouse located on the old Santa Fe Trail northeast of Napton, Saline County, Missouri.  It is off Interstate 70 and 6 miles west of Arrow Rock, Missouri.  Missouri pioneer Isaac Neff (aka Isaac Nave) was born in Tennessee in 1797 and died in Missouri in 1878. He originally built a log tavern on the site in 1837. The Santa Fe Trail went between the tavern and the barn (later a stage station), skirted the family cemetery, and continued to the northwest. The tavern was torn down in 1890. The stone smokehouse is the only remaining original structure on Neff's former property.

It was added to the National Register of Historic Places in 1978.

References

 History of Saline County, Missouri, Missouri Historical Society, St. Louis, Mo., 1881.
 The Nave Family - 500 Years: Switzerland, Tennessee, Missouri & Montana, by Arian E. Collins, Bordertown Publications, San Diego, Calif., 2006.
 History of Pioneer Families of Missouri, by William Bryan and Robert Rose, originally published by Bryan Brand & Co., St. Louis, Mo., 1876. Reprinted, Lucas Brothers, Columbia, Mo., 1935.

External links
 The Nave Family
 National Register of Historic Places

Commercial buildings on the National Register of Historic Places in Missouri
Commercial buildings completed in 1837
Buildings and structures in Saline County, Missouri
National Register of Historic Places in Saline County, Missouri
Buildings and structures demolished in 1890